The Madras Literary Society is a learned society in Chennai (earlier called Madras), India which was founded in 1817 and in 1830 it became associated with the Royal Asiatic Society of Great Britain and Ireland. It was founded by Sir John Henry Newbolt, Chief Justice of Madras with Benjamin Guy Babington as the founder secretary. The Society produced a journal called the Transactions of the Literary Society of Madras and from 1833 under the name of [Madras] Journal of Literature and Science. Most of the early members were Europeans and the first Indian to be admitted was Kavali Lakshmayya who worked with Colin Mackenzie. The journal ceased publication in 1894. The journal published extensive researches on geology, meteorology, fauna, flora, culture and history. Some of the major contributors to the journal included Thomas C. Jerdon and Walter Elliot. The library run by the society in a red sandstone building in the Department of Public Instruction complex in Nungambakkam is the oldest functional public library in the city and one of the oldest in India. The Government Museum, Chennai started as an extension of the Madras Literary Society library in Nungambakkam before moving to the present premises in Pantheon Road, Egmore. In 1890, a major part of the library's book collection was moved to a new building in the same premises as the museum to form the Connemara Public Library. The main library continues to exist in the premises of the DPI , taken care of by a dedicated committee members and patrons.

See also
 Asiatic Society
 Delhi Archaeological Society

References

External links 

 Madras Journal of Literature and Science
 
 

Scientific societies based in India
1817 establishments in India